Peter Manuel (born 18 November 1950) is a former Sri Lankan cricket umpire. He stood in eleven Test matches between 1993 and 2001 and 45 ODI games between 1992 and 2004.

See also
 List of Test cricket umpires
 List of One Day International cricket umpires

References

1950 births
Living people
Cricketers from Kandy
Sri Lankan Test cricket umpires
Sri Lankan One Day International cricket umpires